Miankuh Rural District is a rural district (dehestan) in Chapeshlu District, Dargaz County, Razavi Khorasan Province, Iran. At the 2006 census, its population was 4,409, in 1,117 families.  The rural district has 22 villages.

References 

Rural Districts of Razavi Khorasan Province
Dargaz County